This is a list of dopaminergic drugs. These are pharmaceutical drugs, naturally occurring compounds and other chemicals that influence the function of the neurotransmitter dopamine.

Receptor ligands

Agonists 

Adamantanes: Amantadine •
Memantine •
Rimantadine

Aminotetralins: 7-OH-DPAT •
8-OH-PBZI •
Rotigotine •
UH-232

Benzazepines: 6-Br-APB •
Fenoldopam •
SKF-38,393 •
SKF-77,434 •
SKF-81,297 •
SKF-82,958 •
SKF-83,959

Ergolines: Bromocriptine •
Cabergoline •
Dihydroergocryptine •
Lisuride •
Lysergic acid diethylamide (LSD) •
Pergolide

Dihydrexidine derivatives: 2-OH-NPA •
A-86,929 •
Ciladopa •
Dihydrexidine •
Dinapsoline •
Dinoxyline •
Doxanthrine

Others: A-68,930 •
A-77,636 •
A-412,997 •
ABT-670 •
ABT-724 •
Aplindore •
Apomorphine •
Aripiprazole •
Azodopa •
Bifeprunox •
BP-897 •
CY-208,243 •
Dizocilpine •
Etilevodopa •
Flibanserin •
Ketamine •
Melevodopa •
Modafinil •
Pardoprunox •
Phencyclidine •
PD-128,907 •
PD-168,077 •
PF-219,061 •
Piribedil •
Pramipexole •
Propylnorapomorphine •
Pukateine •
Quinagolide •
Quinelorane •
Quinpirole •
RDS-127 •
Ro10-5824 •
Ropinirole •
Rotigotine •
Roxindole •
Salvinorin A •
SKF-89,145 •
Sumanirole •
Terguride •
Umespirone •
WAY-100,635

Antagonists 
Typical antipsychotics: Acepromazine •
Azaperone •
Benperidol •
Bromperidol •
Clopenthixol •
Chlorpromazine •
Chlorprothixene •
Droperidol •
Flupentixol •
Fluphenazine •
Fluspirilene •
Haloperidol •
Loxapine •
Mesoridazine •
Methotrimeprazine •
Nemonapride •
Penfluridol •
Perazine •
Periciazine •
Perphenazine •
Pimozide •
Prochlorperazine •
Promazine •
Sulforidazine •
Sulpiride •
Sultopride •
Thioridazine •
Thiothixene •
Trifluoperazine •
Triflupromazine •
Trifluperidol •
Zuclopenthixol

Atypical antipsychotics: Amisulpride •
Asenapine •
Blonanserin •
Cariprazine •
Carpipramine •
Clocapramine •
Clozapine •
Gevotroline •
Iloperidone •
Lurasidone •
Melperone •
Molindone •
Mosapramine •
Ocaperidone •
Olanzapine •
Paliperidone •
Perospirone •
Piquindone •
Quetiapine •
Remoxipride •
Risperidone •
Sertindole •
Tiospirone •
Ziprasidone •
Zotepine

Antiemetics: AS-8112 •
Alizapride •
Bromopride •
Clebopride •
Domperidone •
Metoclopramide •
Thiethylperazine

Others: Amoxapine •
Buspirone •
Butaclamol •
Ecopipam •
N-Ethoxycarbonyl-2-ethoxy-1,2-dihydroquinoline (EEDQ) •
Eticlopride •
Fananserin •
L-745,870 •
Nafadotride •
Nuciferine •
PNU-99,194 •
Raclopride •
Sarizotan •
SB-277,011-A •
SCH-23,390 •
SKF-83,566 •
SKF-83,959 •
Sonepiprazole •
Spiperone •
Spiroxatrine •
Stepholidine •
Tetrahydropalmatine •
Tiapride •
UH-232 •
Yohimbine

Reuptake inhibitors

Dopamine transporter (DAT) inhibitors 
Piperazines: DBL-583 •
GBR-12,935 •
Nefazodone •
Vanoxerine

Piperidines: 1-(1-(1-Benzothiophen-2-yl)cyclohexyl)piperidine (BTCP) •
Desoxypipradrol •
Dextromethylphenidate •
Difemetorex •
Ethylphenidate •
Methylnaphthidate •
Isopropylphenidate •
Methylphenidate •
Phencyclidine •
Pipradrol

Pyrrolidines: Diphenylprolinol •
Methylenedioxypyrovalerone (MDPV) •
Naphyrone •
Prolintane •
Pyrovalerone

Tropanes: 3β-(4'-Chlorophenyl)-2β-(3'-phenylisoxazol-5'-yl)tropane (β-CPPIT) •
Altropane •
Brasofensine •
WIN 35428 (β-CFT) •
Cocaine •
Dichloropane •
Difluoropine •
N-(2'-Fluoroethyl-)-3β-(4'-chlorophenyl)-2β-(3'-phenylisoxazol-5'-yl)nortropane (FE-β-CPPIT) •
N-(3'-Fluoropropyl-)-3β-(4'-chlorophenyl)-2β-(3'-phenylisoxazol-5'-yl)nortropane (FP-β-CPPIT) •
Ioflupane (123I) •
Iometopane •
RTI-112 •
RTI-113 •
RTI-121 •
RTI-126 •
RTI-150 •
RTI-177 •
RTI-229 •
RTI-336 •
Tenocyclidine •
Tesofensine •
Troparil •
Tropoxane •
2β-Propanoyl-3β-(4-tolyl)-tropane (WF-11) •
2β-Propanoyl-3β-(2-naphthyl)-tropane (WF-23) •
2-Propanoyl-3-(4-isopropylphenyl)-tropane (WF-31) •
2α-(Propanoyl)-3β-(2-(6-methoxynaphthyl))-tropane (WF-33)

Others: Adrafinil •
Armodafinil •
Amfonelic acid •
Amineptine •
Benzatropine (benztropine) •
Bromantane •
2-Butyl-3-(p-tolyl)quinuclidine (BTQ) •
BTS-74,398 •
Bupropion (amfebutamone) •
Ciclazindol •
Diclofensine •
Dimethocaine •
Diphenylpyraline •
Dizocilpine •
DOV-102,677 •
DOV-21,947 •
DOV-216,303 •
Etybenzatropine (ethylbenztropine) •
EXP-561 •
Fencamine •
Fencamfamine •
Fezolamine •
GYKI-52,895 •
Hydrafinil •
Indatraline •
Ketamine •
Lefetamine •
Levophacetoperane •
LR-5182 •
Manifaxine •
Mazindol •
Medifoxamine •
Mesocarb •
Modafinil •
Nefopam •
Nomifensine •
NS-2359 •
O-2172 •
Pridefrine •
Propylamphetamine •
Radafaxine •
SEP-225,289 •
SEP-227,162 •
Sertraline •
Sibutramine •
Tametraline •
Tripelennamine

Vesicular monoamine transporter (VMAT) inhibitors 
Deserpidine •
Ibogaine •
Reserpine •
Tetrabenazine

Releasing agents 

Morpholines: Fenbutrazate •
Morazone •
Phendimetrazine •
Phenmetrazine

Oxazolines: 4-Methylaminorex (4-MAR, 4-MAX) •
Aminorex •
Clominorex •
Cyclazodone •
Fenozolone •
Fluminorex •
Pemoline •
Thozalinone

Phenethylamines (also amphetamines, cathinones, phentermines, etc.): 2-Hydroxyphenethylamine (2-OH-PEA) •
4-Chlorophenylisobutylamine (4-CAB) •
4-Methylamphetamine (4-MA) •
4-Methylmethamphetamine (4-MMA) •
Alfetamine •
Amfecloral •
Amfepentorex •
Amfepramone •
Amphetamine (dextroamphetamine, levoamphetamine) •
Amphetaminil •
β-Methylphenethylamine (β-Me-PEA) •
Benzodioxolylbutanamine (BDB) •
Benzodioxolylhydroxybutanamine (BOH) •
Benzphetamine •
Buphedrone •
Butylone •
Cathine •
Cathinone •
Clobenzorex •
Clortermine •
D-Deprenyl •
Dimethoxyamphetamine (DMA) •
Dimethoxymethamphetamine (DMMA) •
Dimethylamphetamine •
Dimethylcathinone (dimethylpropion, metamfepramone) •
Ethcathinone (ethylpropion) •
Ethylamphetamine •
Ethylbenzodioxolylbutanamine (EBDB) •
Ethylone •
Famprofazone •
Fenethylline •
Fenproporex •
Flephedrone •
Fludorex •
Furfenorex •
Hordenine •
Lophophine (homomyristicylamine) •
Mefenorex •
Mephedrone •
Methamphetamine (desoxyephedrine, methedrine; dextromethamphetamine, levomethamphetamine) •
Methcathinone (methylpropion) •
Methedrone •
Methoxymethylenedioxyamphetamine (MMDA) •
Methoxymethylenedioxymethamphetamine (MMDMA) •
Methylbenzodioxolylbutanamine (MBDB) •
Methylenedioxyamphetamine (MDA, tenamfetamine) •
Methylenedioxyethylamphetamine (MDEA) •
Methylenedioxyhydroxyamphetamine (MDOH) •
Methylenedioxymethamphetamine (MDMA) •
Methylenedioxymethylphenethylamine (MDMPEA, homarylamine) •
Methylenedioxyphenethylamine (MDPEA, homopiperonylamine) •
Methylone •
Ortetamine •
Parabromoamphetamine (PBA) •
Parachloroamphetamine (PCA) •
Parafluoroamphetamine (PFA) •
Parafluoromethamphetamine (PFMA) •
Parahydroxyamphetamine (PHA) •
Paraiodoamphetamine (PIA) •
Paredrine (norpholedrine, oxamphetamine) •
Phenethylamine (PEA) •
Pholedrine •
Phenpromethamine •
Prenylamine •
Propylamphetamine •
Tiflorex (flutiorex) •
Tyramine (TRA) •
Xylopropamine •
Zylofuramine

Piperazines: 2,5-Dimethoxy-4-bromobenzylpiperazine (2C-B-BZP) •
Benzylpiperazine (BZP) •
Methoxyphenylpiperazine (MeOPP, paraperazine) •
Methylbenzylpiperazine (MBZP) •
Methylenedioxybenzylpiperazine (MDBZP, piperonylpiperazine)

Others: 2-Amino-1,2-dihydronaphthalene (2-ADN) •
2-Aminoindane (2-AI) •
2-Aminotetralin (2-AT) •
4-Benzylpiperidine (4-BP) •
5-Iodo-2-aminoindane (5-IAI) •
Clofenciclan •
Cyclopentamine •
Cypenamine •
Cyprodenate •
Feprosidnine •
Gilutensin •
Heptaminol •
Hexacyclonate •
Indanylaminopropane (IAP) •
Indanorex •
Isometheptene •
Methylhexanamine •
Naphthylaminopropane (NAP) •
Octodrine •
Phthalimidopropiophenone •
Propylhexedrine (levopropylhexedrine) •
Tuaminoheptane (tuamine)

Enzyme inhibitors

Synthesis inhibitors

Phenylalanine hydroxylase inhibitors 
3,4-Dihydroxystyrene

Tyrosine hydroxylase inhibitors 
3-Iodotyrosine •
Aquayamycin •
Bulbocapnine •
Metirosine •
Oudenone

Aromatic L-amino acid decarboxylase inhibitors (DOPA decarboxylase inhibitors) 
Benserazide •
Carbidopa •
Genistein •
Methyldopa

Degradation inhibitors

Monoamine oxidase (MAO) inhibitors 

Nonselective: Benmoxin •
Caroxazone •
Echinopsidine •
Furazolidone •
Hydralazine •
Indantadol •
Iproclozide •
Iproniazid •
Isocarboxazid •
Isoniazid •
Linezolid •
Mebanazine •
Metfendrazine •
Nialamide •
Octamoxin •
Paraxazone •
Phenelzine •
Pheniprazine •
Phenoxypropazine •
Pivalylbenzhydrazine •
Procarbazine •
Safrazine •
Tranylcypromine

MAO-A selective: Amiflamine •
Bazinaprine •
Befloxatone •
Befol •
Brofaromine •
Cimoxatone •
Clorgiline •
Esuprone •
Harmala alkaloids (harmine, harmaline, tetrahydroharmine, harman, norharman, etc.) •
Methylene blue •
Metralindole •
Minaprine •
Moclobemide •
Pirlindole •
Sercloremine •
Tetrindole •
Toloxatone •
Tyrima

MAO-B selective: D-Deprenyl •
Selegiline (L-deprenyl) •
Ladostigil •
Lazabemide •
Milacemide •
Mofegiline •
Pargyline •
Rasagiline •
Safinamide

Catechol-O-methyl transferase (COMT) inhibitors 
Entacapone •
Nitecapone •
Opicapone •
Tolcapone

Dopamine beta hydroxylase inhibitors 
Bupicomide •
Disulfiram •
Dopastin •
Fusaric acid •
Nepicastat •
Phenopicolinic acid •
Tropolone

Others

Precursors 

L-Phenylalanine → L-tyrosine → L-DOPA (levodopa)

Cofactors 
Ferrous iron (Fe2+) •
Tetrahydrobiopterin •
Vitamin B3 (niacin, nicotinamide → NADPH) •
Vitamin B6 (pyridoxine, pyridoxamine, pyridoxal → pyridoxal phosphate) •
Vitamin B9 (folic acid → tetrahydrofolic acid) •
Vitamin C (ascorbic acid) •
Zinc (Zn2+)

Activity enhancers 
Benzofuranylpropylaminopentane (BPAP) •
Phenylpropylaminopentane (PPAP) •
Selegiline (L-deprenyl)

Toxins 
Oxidopamine (6-hydroxydopamine)

Levodopa prodrugs 
XP21279

Photoswitchable ligands 
A photoswitchable agonist of D1-like receptors (azodopa) has been described that allows reversible control of dopaminergic transmission in wildtype animals.

References 

 
 
 
 
Dopaminergics